Dogsomyn Ganbold was a member of the Mongolian Parliament who was unsuccessfully put forward by President Natsagiin Bagabandi as a possible Prime Minister in opposition to Davaadorjiin Ganbold in the summer of 1998.  Eventually the Democratic Alliance managed to convince President Bagabandi to approve their new candidate Rinchinnyamyn Amarjargal as Prime Minister.

Sources
 Nizam U. Ahmed and Philip Norton. Parliaments of Asia. p. 156.

Members of the State Great Khural
Living people
Year of birth missing (living people)